University is a census-designated place (CDP) and unincorporated community in Orange County, Florida, United States, east of Orlando. The community is centered around the University of Central Florida and includes a location on its south side known as University Park. The area is served by the zip codes 32816 and 32817. As of the 2010 census, the CDP had a population of 31,084. It is part of the Orlando–Kissimmee–Sanford, Florida Metropolitan Statistical Area.

Geography 

The University CDP is northeast of Union Park and north of Alafaya. The community is reachable by SR 408, SR 434, and SR 50 (Colonial Drive), which forms the CDP's southern edge.

References

Unincorporated communities in Orange County, Florida
Greater Orlando
Unincorporated communities in Florida
Census-designated places in Florida